This article lists political parties in Armenia. Armenia has a multi-party system with numerous political parties, who mostly work with each other to form coalition governments, with some parties having a history of changing in and out of government functions. As of June 2021, there are 100 political parties in Armenia which are registered with the Ministry of Justice.

Parliamentary parties
Current political representation in the National Assembly following the 2021 Armenian parliamentary election:

Extra-parliamentary major parties 
The extra-parliamentary parties listed below have no seats in the current National Assembly, but had at least one seat since 2007:

Other parties
Below is a list of other active political parties in Armenia:

Dissolved parties
The following political parties have been officially dissolved:

See also

 List of political parties in Artsakh
 Lists of political parties
 List of political parties in Eastern Europe
 Programs of political parties in Armenia
 Politics of Armenia

References

Armenia
 
Political parties
Armenia
Armenia
Political parties